, Japan, is a national university located in Ibaraki Prefecture, with campuses in the cities of Mito, Ami and Hitachi. It was established on May 31, 1949, integrating these prewar institutions: Mito High School (Mito Kōtō-Gakkō), Ibaraki Normal School (Ibaraki Shihan-Gakkō), Ibaraki Juvenile Normal School (Ibaraki Seinen Shihan-Gakkō), and Taga Technical Specialists' College (Taga Kōgyō Senmon-Gakkō). The initial colleges were the College of Arts and Sciences, the College of Education, and the College of Engineering.

Undergraduate and Graduate Schools 
Undergraduate Courses
College of Humanities and Social Sciences (at Mito Campus)
College of Education (at Mito Campus)
College of Science (at Mito Campus)
College of Engineering (at Hitachi Campus)
College of Agriculture (at Ami Campus)

Graduate Courses
Graduate School of Humanities
Graduate School of Education
Graduate School of Science and Engineering
Graduate School of Agriculture

Research Institutes 
Institute of Regional Studies
Institute of Izura Art Culture
Frontier Research Center for Applied Atomic Sciences

Timeline 
1952, April - Ibaraki Prefectural University of Agriculture (Noka Daigaku) was placed under national management and established as the College of Agriculture, Ibaraki University
1955, June - Establishment of Izura Institute of Arts and Culture
1955, July - Establishment of the Junior College of Technology
1967, June - Establishment of the College of Humanities, the College of Science, and the College of Liberal Arts as a result of the reorganization of the College of Arts and Sciences
1968, April - Establishment of the Graduate School of Engineering
1969, January - Establishment of the Institute of General Regional Studies*
1970, April - Establishment of the Graduate School of Agriculture
1973, April - Opening of the University Health Center
1979, April - Establishment of the Graduate School of Science
1985, April - Became a constitutive university for the United Graduate School of Agricultural Science (Doctoral program) in Tokyo University of Agriculture and Technology
1985, July - Establishment of the Information Processing Center*
1988, April - Establishment of the Graduate School of Education
1989, May - Establishment of the Center for Cooperative Research and Development
1991, April - Establishment of the Graduate School of Humanities, and the Center for Instrumental Analysis
1992, April - Establishment of the Center for Education and Research in Lifelong Learning
1993, March - Abolition of the Junior College of Technology
1993, April - Establishment of the Graduate School of Engineering (Doctoral program)
1995, April - Merger of the Graduate School of Engineering and the Graduate School of Science into the Graduate School of Science and Engineering
1996, March - Abolition of the College of Liberal Arts
1996, April - Establishment of Center for Research and Development in University Education*
1997, April - Establishment of Center for Water Environmental Studies
1998, April - Reorganization of Information Processing Center
1999, April - Opening of Gene Research Center
2006, April - Establishment of Institute for Global Change Adaptation Science
2008, April - Establishment of Frontier Research Center for Applied Atomic Sciences
2014, April - Establishment of Social Collaboration Center
2017, April - Reorganization of College of Humanities and Social Sciences and Institute for Liberal Arts Education

* indicates facilities established according to the university's internal decisions.

External links 

Ibaraki University Official Homepage

Educational institutions established in 1949
Universities and colleges in Ibaraki Prefecture
Japanese national universities
1949 establishments in Japan
Mito, Ibaraki
Hitachi, Ibaraki